Aluísio Chaves Ribeiro Moraes Júnior (born 4 April 1987), commonly known as Júnior Moraes or just Moraes, is a professional footballer who plays for Corinthians as a forward. Born in Brazil, he received Ukrainian citizenship in March 2019 and represents the Ukraine national team.

Biography
Moraes was born in a family of sportsmen. His father was a very good football player. He played for Flamengo and Santos. His brother Bruno also played for Santos and Porto and still in activity, while his sister ended her football career because of an injury. His mother was a Paulista tennis champion.

He started to play football in São Paulo when he was 4 years old, being in the same group with Robinho.

Career

Santos
Moraes was promoted to the senior team of Santos by coach Vanderlei Luxemburgo at the age of 18.

He then scored a goal in the 2007 Campeonato Paulista final between Santos and São Caetano, helping his side to the title.

Gloria Bistrița

Moraes made an impressive debut in Liga I for Gloria Bistrița, scoring 10 goals in 17 appearances. His good run continued in the first part of the 2010–11 Liga I season as he accumulated a total of 18 goals for Gloria Bistrița in the Romanian championship.

Metalurh Donetsk
On 12 February 2011, Gloria Bistrița announced that Moraes was sold to Ukrainian Premier League squad Metalurh Donetsk, for a reported fee of €1.25 million. However, Moraes never played a game for Metalurh before he rejoined the team in the summer of 2012.

CSKA Sofia
Before 2011–12 season Moraes joined Bulgarian side CSKA Sofia. He made his A Group debut on 12 September 2011 in a 3–0 home win over Lokomotiv Plovdiv, scoring a penalty. On 2 October, Moraes scored twice in a 3–0 away win over Svetkavitsa. He scored a hattrick versus Litex Lovech on 19 May. Moraes eventually finished the 2011–12 A Group season as joint top scorer with Ivan Stoyanov.

Dynamo Kyiv

On 22 May 2015, Moraes signed a three-year contract with Dynamo Kyiv, who at the time have won the Ukrainian League which had automatically qualified them to the UEFA Champions League group stage. Since his contract with Metalurh was expiring in the summer of 2015, he joined Dynamo as a free agent. He made his official debut for Dynamo in the Ukrainian Super Cup against Shakhtar Donetsk, which Dynamo lost 0–2, conceding both goals in the injury time of the second half while being down to 10 men. Despite the loss, Moraes was one of the best players on the pitch as he got many opportunities, one of which hit the crossbar. On 25 July 2015, Moraes scored his first official goal for Dynamo on the 61st minute in a 2–0 win against Olimpik Donetsk in the Ukrainian Premier League and was one of the best players on the pitch despite the fact that his team was down to 9 men in the second half.

On 16 September 2015, Moraes made his UEFA Champions League debut in a 2–2 draw against Portuguese club FC Porto in the group stage. On 29 September 2015, Moraes scored his first ever UEFA Champions League goal in the second group stage match, scoring the second goal on the 50th minute in a 0–2 away win against Israeli club Maccabi Tel Aviv. In that season he helped Dynamo reach the 1/8 of the UEFA Champions League for the first time in 16 years, getting knocked out by Manchester City 1–3 on aggregate, as well as winning the Ukrainian Premier League.

Shakhtar Donetsk
On 18 June 2018, Moraes signed a two-year contract with Shakhtar Donetsk after his contract with his previous club and Shakhtar's UPL rival Dynamo Kyiv ran out.

On 8 December 2021, Moraes extended his contract with Shakhtar Donetsk until 30 June 2022.

Corinthians
On 16 March 2022, Moraes joined Corinthians on a permanent deal until December 2023.

International career
Moraes indicated that he would be likely to accept a call-up for Ukraine national team if asked. On 5 March 2019, Ukrainian journalist announced that Moraes has already filed for citizenship and awaits approval. He received Ukrainian citizenship 13 days later by a decree of President Petro Poroshenko and made his debut as a substituted player in the drawn match against Portugal national team on 22 March 2019. He became the third Brazilian to have been capped for Ukraine after Edmar and Marlos, who made their debut in 2011 and 2017, respectively.

Career statistics

Club

International

International goals
Scores and results list Ukraine's goal tally first. Score column indicates score after each Moraes goal.

Honours

Club
Santos
 Campeonato Paulista: 2007

CSKA Sofia
 Bulgarian Supercup: 2011

Dynamo Kyiv
 Ukrainian Premier League: 2015–16
 Ukrainian Super Cup: 2016

Shakhtar Donetsk
 Ukrainian Premier League: 2018–19, 2019–20
 Ukrainian Cup: 2018–19

Individual
A PFG Player of the Year: 2011–12
A PFG Top Scorer: 2011–12 (16 goals)
Ukrainian Premier League Top Scorer: 2018–19 (19 goals), 2019–20 (20 goals)

References

External links

 
 
 
 
 

1987 births
Living people
Sportspeople from Santos, São Paulo
Brazilian emigrants to Ukraine
Naturalized citizens of Ukraine
Ukrainian footballers
Ukraine international footballers
Brazilian footballers
Association football forwards
Santos FC players
Associação Atlética Ponte Preta players
Esporte Clube Santo André players
Sport Club Corinthians Paulista players
ACF Gloria Bistrița players
FC Metalurh Donetsk players
PFC CSKA Sofia players
FC Dynamo Kyiv players
Tianjin Tianhai F.C. players
FC Shakhtar Donetsk players
Campeonato Brasileiro Série A players
Liga I players
First Professional Football League (Bulgaria) players
Ukrainian Premier League players
Ukrainian Premier League top scorers
Chinese Super League players
Expatriate footballers in Romania
Expatriate footballers in Bulgaria
Expatriate footballers in China
Ukrainian expatriate sportspeople in Romania
Ukrainian expatriate sportspeople in Bulgaria
Ukrainian expatriate sportspeople in China
Brazilian expatriate sportspeople in Romania
Brazilian expatriate sportspeople in Bulgaria
Brazilian expatriate sportspeople in China
Ukrainian expatriate footballers
Brazilian expatriate footballers
Expatriate footballers in Ukraine
Expatriate footballers in Brazil
Brazilian expatriate sportspeople in Ukraine
Ukrainian expatriate sportspeople in Brazil